Budak is a surname. Notable people with the surname include:

Albert Budak (born 1985), French footballer
Gökhan Budak (1968–2013), Turkish physicist
Mile Budak, Croatian politician and writer
Mehmet Budak (born 1980), Turkish footballer

Turkish-language surnames